The 3rd Army Corps was an Army corps in the Imperial Russian Army formed on 19 February 1877.

Its headquarters were in Vilnius.

Composition 
The Army Corps composition as of 18 July 1914, at the outbreak of the First World War, was:
 25th Infantry Division headquartered at Dvinsk
1st Brigade
 (headquarters Dvinsk)
 (headquarters Dvinsk)
2nd Brigade (headquarters Dvinsk)
 (headquarters Dvinsk)
 (headquarters Dvinsk)
25th Artillery Brigade
 27th Infantry Division (headquarters Vilnius)
1st Brigade

2nd Brigade

27th Artillery Brigade
5th Rifle Brigade
17th Rifle Regiment
18th Rifle Regiment
19th Rifle Regiment
20th Rifle Regiment
5th Rifle Artillery Division
 3rd Cavalry Division (headquarters Kaunas)
1st Cavalry Brigade

2nd Cavalry Brigade

3rd Horse Artillery Battalion
5th Horse Artillery Battery
6th Horse Artillery Battery 
3rd Mortar-Artillery Division
3rd Engineer Battalion
4th Pontoon Battalion
2nd Communications Company

Personnel

Commanders

Chiefs of Staff
24 February 1877 — 15 May 1885 — Colonel (Major-General after 1 January 1878) 
15 May 1885 — 9 December 1892 — Major-General Ivan Ivanovich Tyvalovich
11 January 1893 — 5 January 1898 — Major-General Stanislav Stanislavovich Novogrebelsky
5 January 1898 — 20 October 1899 — Major-General Nikolai Nilovich Lavrov
2 November 1899 — 17 February 1904 — Major-General Aleksandr Konstantinovich Petrov
24 March 1904 — 12 October 1904 — Major-General Nikolai Sergeyevich Berdyaev
22 October 1904 — 16 June 1906 — Major-General Alexander Frantsevich Ragoza
23 July 1906 — July 1908 — Major-General Baron Aleksandr Georgyevich Ikskul-von-Gildebant
9 July 1908 — 19 October 1914 — Major-General Vladimir Aleksandrovich Chagin
14 December 1914 — 17 July 1915 — Major-General Viktor Viktorovich Eggert
18 July 1915 — 7 February 1917 — Major-General Nikolai Dimitryevich Chausov
8 February 1917 — 4 May 1917 — Major-General Vladimir Nikolayevich Yegoryev
12 May 1917 — 7 August 1917 — Major-General Mikhail Vasilyevich Lebedev
12 August 1917 — 1918 — Major-General Andrey Nikolayevich Suvorov

Chiefs of Artillery
19 March 1877 - 5 December 1889 - Major-General (Lieutenant-General from 30 August 1881) Yakov Mikhailovich Kostogorov
9 January 1890 - 4 February 1893 - Major-General (Lieutenant-General from 30 August 1892) Aleksandr Nikitich Fedortsov-Malysh
4 February 1893 - 19 January 1898 - Lieutenant-General 
19 January 1898 - 10 April 1901 - Major-General (Lieutenant-General from 5 April 1898) 
30 May 1901 - 9 July 1906 - Major-General (Lieutenant-General from 12 June 1903) Aleksey Stepanovich Shepilov 
25 July 1906 - 26 October 1913 - Major-General (Lieutenant-General from 22 April 1907) Dmitry Ivanovich Nevadovsky
18 December 1913 - 16 April 1916 - Major-General (Lieutenant-General from 12 June 1914) Count 
13 May 1916 - 18 February 1917 - Major-General Konstantin Konstantinovich Pilkin
From 18 February 1917 - Major-General

Corps quartermasters 
17 February 1898 - 19 July 1900 - Colonel Viktor Ivanovich Lang, 
23 July 1900 - 1905 - state councilor Mikhail Ivanovich Levandovsky
13 November 1905 - 8 August 1910 - Lieutenant-Colonel (Colonel from 12 June 1906) Zenon Avgustinovich Vorotnitsky
16 August 1910 - after 1 March 1914 - Lieutenant-Colonel (Colonel from 14 April 1913) Aleksandr Mikhailovich Vishnyakov

See also
 List of Imperial Russian Army formations and units

References

Corps of the Russian Empire
Military units and formations established in 1877
1877 establishments in the Russian Empire